Faraar is a 1975 Bollywood crime film drama. The film is produced by Alankar Chitra and directed by Shanker Mukherjee. The film stars Amitabh Bachchan, Sharmila Tagore, Sanjeev Kumar, Sulochna, Sajjan, Agha and Bhagwan Dada. The music is by Kalyanji Anandji. The movie was remade in Malayalam by Priyadarshan as Parayanumvayya Parayathirikkanumvayya.

Plot
The film is based around a middle-class man, Rajesh (Bachchan) living with his sister. He is in love with a young woman, and he intends to marry her once he has found a potential husband to take care of his sister. However, one day the sister is raped and murdered and the police are unable to find any clues and it is left to Rajesh to find the murderers and avenge her death. He traces the murderer and kills him, and is therefore now on the run from the police himself. Rajesh abducts a child as a hostage and seeks refuge in a house only to later learn that the child is the son of his former lover, who is now married to a Police Inspector. Rajesh is torn — whether to release the child, or to use him to make an escape.He uses the child and invades their home, but soon found an affection towards the child. However, Inspector Sanjay, Rajesh,s former lover Asha (now Mala), is always trying to arrest him to police and even pleads Rajesh to handover himself to the police, so that if he is really not guilty then he will be proved innocent in court. But Rajesh, who has already lost faith on law, refused to handover himself to police. Despite several attempts to arrest him, Sanjay fails. When one day Sanjay beats him and tries to nab him, Mala intervenes, and thus Sanjay starts suspecting Mala, and soon learns about the relationship between Rajesh and Mala, who has changed her name from Asha to Mala so that nobody suspects her. Sanjay starts abusing her, and in the meantime, the child gets lost. Rajesh,who has fled from the house for another shelter, found the child but soon an accident occurs. Rajesh, who has the same blood group that of the child, donates blood and leave with a message to Sanjay that not to suspect Mala, for what she did was to save her child only. At this, Sanjay feels pity for Rajesh and with his force, tries to stop him. He asks Rajesh to come out from his hideout, but Rajesh refuses. He then orders Mala to bring him. But Rajesh said he now has no relationship with her. But suddenly Mala falls down, Rajesh comes out of his hideout screaming, and two police officers shot him on his chest. A dying Rajesh falls down in Sanjay,s lap, and asks not to grieve for him, because he himself sacrificed his life to ensure a better life for the other human beings who suffered for his revenge. The film ends with everybody standing around Rajesh, s pyre.

Cast
Amitabh Bachchan as Rajesh (Raj)
Sharmila Tagore as Mala / Asha
Sanjeev Kumar as Inspector Sanjay
Sulochana Latkar as  Raj's Mother
Rajan Haksar as  Tarun Kumar
D.K. Sapru as Defence Lawyer
Bhagwan as the Constable
Murad as the Police Commissioner

Soundtrack
Lyrics: Rajendra Krishan

External links

1975 films
1970s Hindi-language films
1975 crime drama films
Films scored by Kalyanji Anandji
Hindi films remade in other languages
Indian crime drama films